Amazulu FC was a football club based in Bulawayo, Zimbabwe. The club played in the Zimbabwe Premier Soccer League.

The team was founded in 1996 by Charles Mhlauri and after nine years the club was dissolved.

In 2003 the team has won the Zimbabwe Premier Soccer League.

Honours
Zimbabwe Premier Soccer League:2003

Performance in CAF competitions
CAF Champions League: 1 appearance
2004 – First Round

See also
 List of football clubs in Zimbabwe
 Football in Zimbabwe
 Zimbabwe Premier Soccer League

References

Football clubs in Zimbabwe
Sport in Bulawayo
Association football clubs established in 1996
Association football clubs disestablished in 2005
1996 establishments in Zimbabwe
2005 disestablishments in Zimbabwe